Jack Thomas Cuffe (8 March 1931 – 12 June 2018) was an Australian rules footballer who played with North Melbourne and St Kilda in the Victorian Football League (VFL).

Notes

External links 

1931 births
2018 deaths
Australian rules footballers from Victoria (Australia)
North Melbourne Football Club players
St Kilda Football Club players